Victor Margueritte (1 December 186623 March 1942) was a French novelist. He was the younger brother of Paul Margueritte (1860–1918).

Life
He and his brother were born in Algeria. They were the sons of General Jean Auguste Margueritte (1823–1870), who after a career in Algeria was mortally wounded in the great cavalry charge at Sedan and died in Belgium on 6 September 1870. An account of their father's life was published by Paul as Mon père (1884; enlarged ed., 1897). The names of the two brothers are generally associated, on account of their collaboration.

Victor entered his father's regiment, the Chasseurs d'Afrique, in 1888, and served in the army until 1896, when he resigned his commission. He was already known by some volumes of poetry, and by a translation from Calderon (played at the Odéon, 1898) when he began to collaborate with his brother. Together they worked on several novels and historical works.

Victor Margueritte wrote several theatrical "charades" and collaborated with Paul on at least one pantomime: La Peur.  His novel La Garçonne (1922), which depicted a sexually liberated young woman who wanted to "live like a man," was considered so shocking it caused the author to lose his Légion d'honneur.

Works 
thumb|upright=1

Novels
Prostituée (1907)
Le Talion (1908)
Jeunes Filles (1908)
Le Petit roi d'ombre (1909) 
Le Talion (1909)
L'Or (1910)
Le Journal d'un moblot (1912)
Les Frontières du Cœur (1912)
La Rose des ruines (1913)
La Terre natale (1917)
La bétail humain (1920)
Un cœur farouche (1921)
Le Soleil dans la geôle (1921)
The Bachelor Girl (1922)
Le Compagnon (1923)
Le Couple (1924)
Vers le bonheur. Ton corps est à toi (1927)
Vers le bonheur. Le Bétail humain (1928)
Vers le bonheur. Le Chant du berger (1930)
Non ! roman d'une conscience (1931)
Debout les vivants ! (1932) 
Nos égales. Roman de la femme d'aujourd'hui (1933)
Du sang sur l'amour (1934)
Babel (1934)

Essays
Pour mieux vivre (1914)
J.-B. Carpeaux (1914)
Au bord du gouffre, août-septembre 1914 (1919)
La Voix de l'Égypte (1919)
La Dernière Guerre : les Criminels (1925)
Jean-Jacques et l'amour (1926)
La Patrie humaine (1931)
Un grand Français. Le général Margueritte. With pages by Paul Margueritte from Mon père. Centenaire algérien (1960)
Aristide Briand (1932)
Les Femmes et le désarmement et de l'immortalité en littérature (1932)
Avortement de la S.D.N. (1936)
 Le cadavre maquillé. la S.D.N. (mars-septembre 1936) (1936)

Various
La Belle au bois dormant (1896), one-act féerie in verse
La Double méprise, ou le Pire n'est pas toujours certain, d'après Calderon, comedy in four acts in verse, Paris, Théâtre de l'Odéon, 17 March 1898
Au Fil de l'heure (1896), poetry collection
L'Imprévu, comedy in two acts, Paris, Comédie-Française, 19 February 1910
La Mère, play in a prologue and eight scenes, based on the novel by Maxim Gorky, Paris, Théâtre de la Renaissance, 15 May 1937
Nocturnes, poems (1944)

With Paul Margueritte
La Pariétaire (1896)
Le Carnaval de Nice (1897)
Poum, aventures d'un petit garçon (1897)
Une époque (4 volumes, 1897–1904)
 Le désastre (Metz, 1870)
 Les tronçons du glaive (La défense nationale, 1870-71)
 Les braves gens (Épisodes, 1870-71)
 La Commune (Paris, 1871)
Femmes nouvelles (1899)
Le Poste des neiges (1899)
Mariage et divorce (1900)
Les Deux Vies (1902)
Le Jardin du Roi (1902)
L'Eau souterraine (1903)
Zette, histoire d'une petite fille (1903)
Histoire de la guerre de 1870-71 (1903)
Le Prisme (1905)
Quelques idées : le mariage libre, autour du mariage, pèlerins de Metz, l'oubli et l'histoire, les charges de Sedan, l'officier dans la nation armée, l'Alsace-Lorraine (1905)
Le Cœur et la loi, play in three acts, Paris, Théâtre de l'Odéon, 9 October 1905
Sur le vif (1906)
Vanité (1907)
L'Autre, play in three acts, Paris, Comédie-Française, 9 December 1907
Nos Tréteaux. Charades de Victor Margueritte. Pantomimes de Paul Margueritte (1910)
Les Braves Gens. La Chevauchée au gouffre (Sedan) (1935)

References

1866 births
1942 deaths
Collège Stanislas de Paris alumni
19th-century French novelists
19th-century French dramatists and playwrights
19th-century French male writers
20th-century French novelists
20th-century French dramatists and playwrights
20th-century French male writers
People from Blida
French male novelists
French male dramatists and playwrights
Victor